Heloise Ruth First (4 May 1925 – 17 August 1982) was a South African anti-apartheid activist and scholar. She was assassinated in Mozambique, where she was working in exile, by a parcel bomb built by South African police.

Family and education
Ruth First's Jewish parents, Julius First and Matilda Levetan, emigrated to South Africa from Latvia in 1906 and became founding members of the Communist Party of South Africa (CPSA), the forerunner of the South African Communist Party (SACP). Ruth First was born in 1925 and brought up in Johannesburg. Like her parents, she joined the Communist Party, which was allied with the African National Congress in its struggle to overthrow the South African government.

As a teenager, First attended Jeppe High School for Girls and then became the first person in her family to attend university. She received her bachelor's degree from the University of the Witwatersrand in 1946. While she was at university, she found that "on a South African campus, the student issues that matter are national issues". She was involved in the founding of the Federation of Progressive Students, also known as the Progressive Students League, and got to know, among other fellow students, Nelson Mandela, future President of South Africa, and Eduardo Mondlane, the first leader of the Mozambique freedom movement FRELIMO.

After graduating, First worked as a research assistant for the Social Welfare Division of the Johannesburg City Council. In 1946, her position in the Communist Party was boosted significantly after a series of mine strikes during which leading members of the Party were arrested. First then became the editor-in-chief of the radical newspaper The Guardian, which was subsequently banned by the state. Through investigative journalism, First exposed the racial segregation policies known as apartheid, targeting black South Africans following the rise of the National Party in 1948. In 1949 she married Joe Slovo, a South African anti-apartheid activist and Communist, with whom she had three daughters, Shawn, Gillian and Robyn. Together, Slovo and First became a leading force in the 1950s protest era in which the government outlawed any movements that opposed their policies.

In addition to her work with The Guardian and its successors, the South African Congress of Democrats (COD), a white-only wing of the Congress Alliance, was founded in 1953 with support from First. In 1955, she assumed the position of editor of a radical political journal called Fighting Talk. First and Slovo were also members of the African National Congress, in addition to the Communist Party. She also played an active role during the extensive riots of the 1950s.

Treason trial and detention
First was one of the defendants in the Treason Trial of 1956–1961, alongside 156 other leading anti-apartheid activists who were key figures in the Congress Alliance. First's early work and writings were largely used as evidence to prove treason on behalf of the Congress Alliance. Following four years of harassment by the state, First alongside the 155 other activists were all acquitted of their charges. After the state of emergency that followed the Sharpeville massacre in 1960, she was listed and banned. She could not attend meetings or publish, and she could not be quoted. In 1963, during another government crackdown, she was imprisoned and held in isolation without charge for 117 days under the Ninety-Day Detention Law. She was the first white woman to be detained under this law.

Exile and assassination

In March 1964, First went into exile in London, where she became active in the British Anti-Apartheid Movement. She was a Research Fellow at the University of Manchester in 1972, and between 1973 and 1978 she lectured in development studies at the University of Durham. She also spent periods on secondment at universities in Dar es Salaam and Lourenço Marques, Maputo.

In November 1978, First took up the post of director of research at the Centre of African Studies (Centro de Estudos Africanos), Universidade Eduardo Mondlane in Maputo, Mozambique. She was assassinated by order of Craig Williamson, a major in the South African Police, on 17 August 1982, when she opened a parcel bomb that had been sent to the university. Bridget O'Laughlin, an anthropologist working with First, was in First's office when she was murdered, and testified to the Truth and Reconciliation Commission.

Memoirs
First's book, 117 Days, is her account of her arrest, imprisonment and interrogation by the South African Police Special Branch in 1963. It was first published in 1965. The memoir provides a detailed account of how she endured "isolation and sensory deprivation" while withstanding "pressure to provide information about her comrades to the Special Branch".
 
Her daughter, the writer Gillian Slovo, published her own memoir, Every Secret Thing: My Family, My Country, in 1997. It is an account of her childhood in South Africa and her relationship with her activist parents.

Films
The film A World Apart (1988), which has a screenplay by her daughter Shawn Slovo and was directed by Chris Menges, is a biographical story about a young white girl living in South Africa with anti-apartheid activist parents, although the family is called Roth in the film. Barbara Hershey plays the character based on Ruth First.

The 2006 film Catch a Fire about the activist Patrick Chamusso was written by Shawn Slovo, and in it First is portrayed by another daughter, Robyn Slovo, who was also one of the film's producers.

Patrol vessel

In 2005, the South African Department of Environmental Affairs launched an environmental patrol vessel named Ruth First.

In March 2011, the country of The Gambia issued a postage stamp in her honour, naming her as one of the Legendary Heroes of Africa.

Main published works

 
 
 with R. Segal, 
 
 coedited with J. Steele and C. Gurney,

See also
List of people subject to banning orders under apartheid
Marion Sparg - female ANC guerilla sentenced to 25 years in prison for treason
Gert Sibande
South African potato boycott

References

External links
Ruth First Papers online
Ruth First papers at the University of London
Ruth First Educational Trust provides opportunities for South African postgraduate students to study at Durham University.
The First pan-African martyr, Mail & Guardian, Adekeye Adebajo, 25 August 2010
Ruth First Jeppe High School for Girls Memorial Trust  was set up in July 2010 and will award scholarships for full tuition at Jeppe High School for Girls for the duration of secondary school education.  It is aimed at girls in Grade 7 that show characteristics of leadership, courage, determination and the ability to influence their community positively.
Remembering Ruth First, a woman with vision, passion, by Peter Vale, The Daily Dispatch, 17 August 2012

Jewish South African anti-apartheid activists
South African communists
South African women in politics
Assassinated Jews
Assassinated South African politicians
Slovo family
South African Jews
South African feminists
South African socialists
Jewish socialists
Academics of Durham University
1925 births
1982 deaths
South African exiles
South African people murdered abroad
South African people of Latvian-Jewish descent
Assassinated activists
Deaths by letter bomb
People murdered in Mozambique
Members of the South African Communist Party
People acquitted of treason
White South African anti-apartheid activists
South African prisoners and detainees
Prisoners and detainees of South Africa
Jewish feminists
20th-century South African politicians
Assassinated South African activists
Members of the Order of Luthuli
Women civil rights activists